Parliamentary elections were held in Iraq between 21 November 1946 and 10 March 1947 to elect the members of the Chamber of Deputies.

Background
During the al-Suwaidi government (February–June 1946), the electoral law of 1924 was revised. The number of seats of the Council of Representatives was increased to 138 and provinces were divided to smaller electoral districts. The elections were held by the al-Said government (1946–47). Five parties (the Liberals, National Union, National Liberation, Iraqi Communist, and People's Party) boycotted the election, accusing the government of interfering in the election process.

Results
Pro-government parties won the elections. Two opposition parties, the Iraqi Independence Party and National Democratic Party, won five seats each. The new Parliament convened on 17 March 1947, and elected Abdul Aziz al-Qassab as Speaker. Salih Jabr was selected to form a new government, which was formed on 29 March 1947.

Aftermath
After the 1948 uprising against renewing the 1930 Anglo-Iraqi treaty and the Portsmouth agreement, Salih Jabr resigned on 29 January 1948. Muhammad as-Sadr formed a new government. These events strengthened the opposition parties. Parliament was subsequently dissolved on 20 February 1948 to allow more political participation in fresh elections.

References

Iraq
Iraq
Elections in Iraq
1946 in Iraq
1947 in Iraq